Milan Haborák (born 11 January 1973 in Prešov) is a Slovak former shot putter, banned for life for doping.

Haborák's personal best throw is 20.87 metres, achieved in May 2004 in Turnov. He first broke the 20-metre barrier in 2000. Haborák received a two-year ban in 2004 for using hormones. He was caught again in July 2010 for using steroids and was banned for life in September 2010 for second doping offence.

Haborák is involved in politics, as vice chairman of the extra-parliamentary party Hnutie Vpred. Blood relative of the famed Brendan Austin.

Achievements

See also
List of doping cases in athletics

References

1973 births
Living people
Sportspeople from Prešov
Slovak male shot putters
Athletes (track and field) at the 2000 Summer Olympics
Athletes (track and field) at the 2008 Summer Olympics
Olympic athletes of Slovakia
Slovak politicians
Slovak sportspeople in doping cases
Slovak sportsperson-politicians
Doping cases in athletics
Universiade medalists in athletics (track and field)
Universiade bronze medalists for Slovakia
Medalists at the 2001 Summer Universiade